Jean-Marie Blas de Roblès is a French writer. He was born in Sidi bel Abbes in Algeria. He has lived and worked in Brazil, Taiwan and Libya. He is best known for his novel Where Tigers Are at Home which won the Prix du roman Fnac, the Grand prix Jean Giono, and the Prix Médicis. It has been translated into English by Mike Mitchell.

References

21st-century French writers
Prix Médicis winners
People from Sidi Bel Abbès
Grand prix Jean Giono recipients
Living people
Year of birth missing (living people)